Future History or future history may refer to:

 Future history, postulated history of the future
 Future History (Heinlein), series of stories by Robert A. Heinlein
 Future History (album), by Jason Derulo